Gudaf Tsegay Desta (born 23 June 1997) is an Ethiopian middle- and long-distance runner. She is the 2020 Tokyo Olympic bronze medallist in the women's 5000 metres. At the World Athletics Championships, she won a bronze for the 1500 metres in 2019 and a silver in this event and gold for the 5000 m in 2022. Tsegay is a two-time 1500 m World Indoor Championship medallist, winning gold in 2022 and bronze in 2016. She is the current world record holder in the indoor 1500 m, the event in which she also set world under-18 (current) and U20 records.

At age 17, she was the 2014 World Junior Championship 1500 m silver medalist. She represented her country over the distance at the 2014 World Indoor Championships. Tsegay is a versatile runner. As of February 2023, she was the world's 10th fastest woman in the indoor 800 metres, and sixth for both the 5000 m and 10,000 metres.

Career
In February 2014, a 17-year-old Gudaf Tsegay set the world's fastest under-18 mark for the indoor 1500 metres with a time of 4m 8.47s in Stockholm. In July, she became the World Junior Championship silver medallist in Eugene, Oregon with a time of 4:10.83, behind her compatriot Dawit Seyaum in 4:09.86.

Two years later, Tsegay broke world under-20 record at this indoor event in a time of 4m 1.81s in Glasgow, beating previous best set by her compatriot Kalkidan Gezahegne in 2010 by more than a second. Tsegay's record was bettered in 2020 by her another compatriot Lemlem Hailu. At the World Indoor Championships held in Portland, Oregon, she won the bronze medal in 4:05.71 behind only Sifan Hassan representing the Netherlands (4:04.96) and Dawit (4:05.30). The then 19-year-old represented Ethiopia in the 800 metres at the 2016 Rio Olympics, where she eliminated in the heat 3, clocking 2:00.13.

In 2017, she competed at the World Championships in London and went out of the 1500 m event in the semi-finals. She fell after the first lap and posted the slowest time, slower by about 13 seconds than that ran in the heats.

At the following World Championships in 2019 in Doha, Qatar, Tsegay won the bronze medal in the event with a personal best time of 3:54.38. Hassan was first in 3:51.95 and Kenya's Faith Kipyegon finished second in 3:54.22.

The next year, she earned her first overall 1500 m World Indoor Tour victory.

2021: World indoor 1500 m record
On 9 February, Tsegay broke an indoor 1500 m world record at the Meeting Hauts-de-France Pas-de-Calais in Liévin. The former mark of 3:55.17 set by her compatriot Genzebe Dibaba in 2014 was lowered by Tsegay to 3 minutes 53.09 seconds.

In June, she posted best time of the year for the 5000 metres with her mark of 14m 13.32s to take a bronze at the event in 14:38.87 at the delayed 2020 Tokyo Olympics. Hassan came first in 14:36.79, and Kenya's Hellen Obiri was second clocking 14:38.36.

2022: World 5000 m champion
In February 2022, she contested the mile in Liévin, possibly with Dibaba's world record of 4:13.31 in her sights. Having fallen on the first lap Tsegay finished in 4:21.72, breaking, however, a 20-year-old meeting record. When chasing her own world indoor record over 1500 m at the Copernicus Cup in Toruń a few days later, she was only 1.68 seconds behind to secure also the second mark on the indoor all-time list. She took comfortable her second overall World Indoor Tour 1500 m victory eight days later at the Villa de Madrid Indoor Meeting, producing another record-breaking 3:57.38, the fifth-fastest result in turn on the world all-time indoor ranking.

Also in March, Tsegay continued her record-breaking form, dominating in her specialist event at the World Indoor Championships in Belgrade. She took her first global title, setting a championship record of 3m 57.19s, and winning by more than five seconds (~30 m). She led an Ethiopian medals sweep as Axumawit Embaye and Hirut Meshesha finished second and third, respectively. It was the first time one country swept the medals in any discipline, and the seventh successive Ethiopian women's victory in the event, at the World Athletics Indoor Championships.

Her best success of that year came in July at the World Championships in Eugene, Oregon, where she won two medals including her first global outdoor title. First the 25-year-old took silver in the 1500 m event, finishing behind only Faith Kipyegon and ahead of Laura Muir. Five days later, she claimed the gold medal for the closely-run 5000 m race with a time of 14:46.29 ahead of Beatrice Chebet in 14:46.75 and compatriot Dawit Seyaum (14:47.36).

Tsegay doubled up at the Diamond League final in Zürich in September, placing third in the 5 kilometres road race and sixth in the 1500 m event.

2023
She got her 2023 campaign off to strong start in February, running indoor mile in Toruń (PL). Tsegay missed the world record but her time of 4:16.16 was the second-fastest ever at the time. The same month, she came within just 0.09 seconds of Dibaba's world indoor 3000 m record, clocking super fast 8:16.69 at the World Indoor Tour final in Birmingham.

Achievements

Personal bests

International competitions

Circuit wins and titles, National titles
 Diamond League
 2018 (1500 m): Stockholm Bauhaus-galan
 World Athletics Indoor Tour 1500 m overall winner: 2020, 2022
 2020 (1500m): Toruń Copernicus Cup, Liévin Meeting Hauts-de-France Pas-de-Calais, Villa de Madrid
 2021: Liévin (1500m), Villa de Madrid (3000m)
 2022: Liévin (Mile), Toruń (1500m, WL MR), Madrid (1500m, MR)
 2023: Toruń (Mile, WL MR), Liévin (1500m, WL}), Birmingham World Indoor Tour Final (3000m, WL MR)
 Ethiopian Athletics Championships
 5000 metres: 2021

References

External links

1997 births
Living people
Ethiopian female middle-distance runners
Place of birth missing (living people)
Athletes (track and field) at the 2016 Summer Olympics
Olympic athletes of Ethiopia
World Athletics Championships athletes for Ethiopia
World Athletics Championships medalists
Athletes (track and field) at the 2020 Summer Olympics
Medalists at the 2020 Summer Olympics
Olympic bronze medalists for Ethiopia
Olympic bronze medalists in athletics (track and field)
World Athletics Indoor Championships winners
20th-century Ethiopian women
21st-century Ethiopian women